Elections to Monmouthshire County Council were held on 1 May 2008. The whole council was up for election and the Conservative party held overall control of the council. The election was preceded by the 2004 elections and followed by the 2012 elections.

Election results: overview

  

|}

  

|}

|}

Electoral division (ward) results

References

External links
Monmouthshire County Council: List of full results
BBC News: Monmouthshire election result 2008

 South Wales Argus: "Tories Romp Home to Monmouthshire Council Election Victory"

Monmouthshire
2008
21st century in Monmouthshire